Belaga Airport  is an airport in Belaga, Sarawak, Malaysia.

Airlines and destinations

Following the takeover routes by MASwings from FlyAsianXpress, the Bintulu-Belaga route has been ceased.

See also

 List of airports in Malaysia

References

External links
Short Take-Off and Landing Airports (STOL) at Malaysia Airports Holdings Berhad

Airports in Sarawak
Belaga District